Captain Bernard Philip Nevile (1 August 1888 – 11 February 1916) was an English first-class cricketer who played five games for Worcestershire in 1913, and another for Free Foresters a year earlier. He also played for and captained Lincolnshire in the Minor Counties Championship.

Career
Born at Wellingore Hall, Lincolnshire, Nevile made his first-class debut in June 1912, playing for Free Foresters against Cambridge University, scoring 4 in his only innings and bowling a single over without reward. He attended Cambridge himself, not getting into the First XI, but gaining a blue for golf.

The following season he appeared five times for Worcestershire, but only twice made an impression. Against Kent in mid-July he took 3–29 in the first innings (his maiden wicket being that of opener Punter Humphreys); and against Surrey a fortnight later, in what proved to be his final game, he claimed a career-best 4-53.

Nevile joined the Army in World War I, and served in the Lincolnshire Regiment. He was killed near Ypres, Belgium at the age of just 27.

His brother Charles also played for Lincolnshire at minor counties level, but did not make a first-class appearance.

References

External links

1888 births
1916 deaths
English cricketers
Worcestershire cricketers
Free Foresters cricketers
Royal Lincolnshire Regiment officers
British Army personnel of World War I
British military personnel killed in World War I
People from North Kesteven District
Lincolnshire cricketers
Military personnel from Lincolnshire